Hawklords is a British space rock band. The band started as a one-off ensemble of musicians formerly associated with Hawkwind, and playing Hawkwind covers. Although the band uses the same name as the short-lived 1978 incarnation of Hawkwind, it is not a  reunion or tribute, though three of the original 1978 Hawklords members (Bainbridge, Griffin, Swindells) were in the band when it reformed, but are not currently members.

History
The germ of the Hawklords started at a concert on 28 September 2008 organised by Nik Turner as a tribute to Robert Calvert. A group of musicians formed a temporary band for the concert, consisting of Ron Tree, Danny Thompson, Nik Turner, Jerry Richards, Alan Davey, Harvey Bainbridge, Steve Swindells, Jim Hawkman, Judge Trev, Martin Griffin, and Adrian Shaw.

Many of the same musicians reunited to play at the memorial concert for Barney Bubbles on 29 October 2009 at London's 229 club. And after the success of this concert the decision was made to form a band to tour Europe. The band was named Hawklords after the temporary incarnation of Hawkwind formed in 1978. The line up for the tour was Ron Tree, Nik Turner, Jerry Richards, Adrian Shaw, Harvey Bainbridge, Steve Swindells and Meurig Griffiths. Alan Davey joined the band for the UK leg of the tour. Concerts were played in Belgium, Netherlands, Germany and the United Kingdom in Autumn 2011.

After the European tour a number of people left and the band restructured to record an album of original material. The album We Are One was recorded during 2012 and released on 24 September 2012. The line up was Harvey Bainbridge, Dave Pearce, Jerry Richards, Adrian Shaw and Ron Tree. Steve Swindells played keyboards on a few of the songs and contributed to the writing of Flight. John Constable, AKA John Crow, contributed additional lyrics for I Am The Wind and Spark In The Dark .

The second album, Dream, was released in 2013. The line up was again Harvey Bainbridge, Dave Pearce, Jerry Richards, Adrian Shaw and Ron Tree, and John Constable contributed additional lyrics for White Rag.

The third album, Censored, was released on 6 October 2014. John Constable contributed a poem for the centre sequence of Damned, and Michael Moorcock wrote a poem entitled Induction especially for the band. Following the release of Censored, Adrian Shaw left and was replaced by Tom Ashurst.

The fourth album R:Evolution was released on 9 October 2015. It reached number 15 in the Official UK Top 30 Progressive Rock Chart and was in the top 75 for over two months. It was also nominated for best rock album of 2015 by One World Music Awards.

The fifth album Fusion was released on 7 October 2016 with Kim McAuliffe guesting on one track.

The band's sixth album Six was released on 6 October 2017. It was the first of a planned trilogy of albums based on the themes of war, peace and love. 
Ron Tree was no longer a member for this release and was not replaced with the core band being Ashurst/Bainbridge/Pearce/Richards.

The second album in that trilogy, Brave New World, was released on 26 October 2018 and the third album, Heaven's Gate, was released on 18 October 2019. Heaven's Gate included keyboards. synths, and vocals by Frederick Reeves (a.k.a. Dead Fred).

The album Time was released on 6 August 2021. It was the first to feature Dead Fred as a full member and the first not to feature Harvey Bainbridge, who had left to pursue a solo career. This was the last album to feature Tom Ashurst on bass. He was replaced by Mr Dibs ex-Hawkwind/Spacehead/Krel in August 2021, in time for the October 2021 tour. Former Hawklords' bassist Adrian Shaw appears on the track "Take Off Your Mask" and saxophonist/flautist  Chris "Beene" Aldridge appears throughout. For the Spring 2022 tour Dead Fred was replaced by Chris Purdon.

Members
Jerry Richards - guitar & vocals
Mr Dibs - bass
Chris Purdon - oscillators and audio generators
Dave Pearce - percussion

Former members and affiliates
Ron Tree - vocals
Adrian Shaw
Steve Swindells
the Legend that was Nik Turner R.I.P Thunder Rider
Meurig Griffiths
Alan Davey
Harvey Bainbridge
Tom Ashurst
Frederick Reeves ("Dead Fred") - synthesizers & vocals

Discography
We Are One – 2012, LORDS0912, distributed by Shellshock
Dream – 2013, LORDS0913, distributed by Shellshock
Censored – 2014, LORDS0914, distributed by Shellshock
R:Evolution – 2015, LORDS1015, distributed by Shellshock
Fusion – 2016, LORDS1016, distributed by Shellshock
Six – 2017, LORDS1017, distributed by Shellshock
Brave New World – 2018, LORDS1018, distributed by Shellshock
Heaven's Gate – 2019, LORDS1019, distributed by Shellshock
Time – 2021

References

External links
Hawklords facebook page
 

Hawkwind
English rock music groups
British space rock musical groups